Vaughn Bell (born 1978, Syracuse, New York) is an environmental artist working with sculpture, installation, performance and video, who lives and works in Seattle, Washington.  Vaughn received her MFA from the Studio for Inter-related Media at Massachusetts College of Art in Boston, MA and her undergraduate degree from Brown University, where her work focused on "Nature and Culture: Human Perspectives on the Natural Environment".

Work 

Bell creates interactive projects and immersive environments which affect the ways in which  we relate to our environment.  She has exhibited her sculpture, installation, performance, video and public projects internationally. Her commissions include installations at the Massachusetts Museum of Contemporary Art, the Edith Russ Site for New Media Art in Oldenburg, Germany, the Owens Walter E. Terhune Art Gallery in Ohio, and the Schuylkill Center for Environmental Education and Chemical Heritage Foundation  in Philadelphia, PA. Her work has been featured in Artnews, Afterimage, and Arcade Journal, among others.

Many of her pieces are "personal biospheres", living spaces into which people can insert themselves at eye-to-ground level to intimately experience the sight, smell, and touch of a growing world. Some are single-person environments while others, like the "biosphere for three" at the Edith Russ House, accommodate multiple people. Vaughn Bell has also explored the boundaries between plants and people by making plants a part of wearable clothing, and treating them like pets.

Bell has been employed as a “staff artist” by the Seattle Department of Transportation (SDOT), working on arts planning and integrating design enhancements into public projects such as trails, sidewalks, and bridges.

Grants, commissions and awards 
20104Culture Grant for ALIVE (A Low Impact Vehicle Exhibition)

2009-2010Jack Straw Productions New Media Gallery Residency

20094Culture Special Projects Grant recipient for "This Land" book

20074Culture Special Projects Grant recipient for "From Sea to Shining Sea"
4Culture Site Specific Performance Network Grant for "CUV”
Kamiyama Japan International Artist in Residence

2006Full Fellowship, Vermont Studio Center
Nancy Graves Foundation Fellow, Millay Colony

2005Home Biosphere Commission for the offices of Carmichael Lynch, Minneapolis, MN

2004Artist in Research Grant, Berwick Research Institute, Boston, MA
Work installed in the offices of the New England Foundation For the Arts, Boston, MA

References

External links 

1978 births
Living people
American installation artists
American women sculptors
Artists from Syracuse, New York
American women installation artists
American women performance artists
American performance artists
American women video artists
American video artists
Environmental artists
Sculptors from New York (state)
21st-century American women artists